Gjøvik Fotballforening was a Norwegian football club from Gjøvik, founded in 2008. The club was dissolved in 2014 as a result of a merger with FK Gjøvik-Lyn.

History
The club was established on 8 October 2008 as a merger of the senior teams of SK Gjøvik-Lyn and Vardal IF. The clubs Vind and Redalen were asked to join, but declined. In May 2009 it faced Rosenborg in the Norwegian football cup, losing 0–4 in front of a 5,000 attendance. In 2010 it won its Third Division group, but lost out in a promotion playoff against Elverum. Gjøvik won their Third Division in 2011 and was promoted to the Second Division.

Season history
{|class="wikitable"
|-bgcolor="#efefef"
! Season
!
! Pos.
! Pl.
! W
! D
! L
! GS
! GA
! P
!Cup
!Notes
|-
|2009
|3. divisjon
|align=right |2
|align=right|22||align=right|15||align=right|4||align=right|3
|align=right|73||align=right|28||align=right|49
|First round
|
|-
|2010
|3. divisjon
|align=right |1
|align=right|22||align=right|20||align=right|1||align=right|1
|align=right|103||align=right|21||align=right|61
|First round
|
|-
|2011 
|3. divisjon
|align=right bgcolor=#DDFFDD| 1
|align=right|26||align=right|22||align=right|3||align=right|1
|align=right|96||align=right|23||align=right|69
|Second round
|Promoted to the 2. divisjon
|-
|2012
|2. divisjon
|align=right |8
|align=right|26||align=right|9||align=right|9||align=right|8
|align=right|38||align=right|43||align=right|36
|Second round 
|
|-
|2013
|2. divisjon
|align=right |9
|align=right|26||align=right|9||align=right|6||align=right|11
|align=right|39||align=right|48||align=right|33
|First round
|
|}

See also
Gjøvik FK

References

External link
Official site

Defunct football clubs in Norway
Association football clubs established in 2008
Sport in Gjøvik
2008 establishments in Norway